Sundsvall Open Trot is an annual Group One harness event for trotters that is held at Bergsåker Racetrack in Sundsvall, Sweden. Sundsvall Open Trot has taken place since 1996. In 2008, the purse of the event was approximately US$273,000 (SEK1,750,000).

Racing conditions
Every edition of Sundsvall Open Trot has been over 2,140 meters (1.33 mile). The race is started by the use of auto start.

Past winners

Horse with most wins
 3 - Victory Tilly (2000, 2001, 2002)

Drivers with most wins
 5 - Örjan Kihlström
 3 - Stig H. Johansson
 3 - Åke Svanstedt

Trainers with most wins
 3 - Stig H. Johansson
 3 - Åke Svanstedt
 2 - Stefan Melander
 2 - Stefan Hultman

Winner with lowest odds
 Winning odds: 1.07 - Victory Tilly (2002)

Winner with highest odds
 Winning odds: 62.50 - Giant Superman (2007)

Fastest winner
 1:10,0 (km rate) - Delicious U.S. (2015)

All winners of Sundsvall Open Trot

See also
 List of Scandinavian harness horse races

References

Harness races in Sweden